Osov may refer to:

 Osov (Beroun District) in Czech Republic
Osov (Belarus) in Belarus